Christopher Priest (born 14 July 1943) is a British novelist and science fiction writer. His works include Fugue for a Darkening Island, The Inverted World, The Affirmation, The Glamour, The Prestige, and The Separation.

Priest has been strongly influenced by the science fiction of H. G. Wells and in 2006 was appointed Vice-President of the international H. G. Wells Society.

Early life

Priest was born in Cheadle, Cheshire, England in 1943.

As a child, Priest spent some time holidaying in the English county of Dorset. Here he explored the ancient hillfort of Maiden Castle, near Dorchester, which he would later use as the location for the novel A Dream of Wessex. He began writing soon after leaving school and has been a full-time freelance writer since 1968.

Career 
Priest's first story, "The Run", was published in 1966. Formerly an accountant and audit clerk, he became a full-time writer in 1968. One of his early novels, The Affirmation, concerns a traumatized man who apparently flips into a delusional world in which he experiences a lengthy voyage to an archipelago of exotic islands. This setting featured in many of Priest's short stories, which raises the question of whether the Dream Archipelago is actually a fantasy. The state of mind depicted in this novel is similar to that of the delusional fantasy-prone psychoanalytic patient ("Kirk Allen") in Robert Lindner's The Fifty-Minute Hour, or Jack London's tortured prisoner in The Star Rover.

Priest also dealt with delusional alternate realities in A Dream of Wessex, in which a group of experimenters for a British government project are brain-wired to a hypnosis machine and jointly participate in an imaginary but as-real-as-real future in a vacation island off the coast of a Sovietized Britain.

His most recent novels are The Islanders (2011), set in the Dream Archipelago, and The Adjacent (2013), a multi-strand narrative with recurring characters.

Of his narrative's plot twists, Priest told an interviewer in 1995, "my shocks are based on a sudden devastating reversal of what the reader knows or believes."

Tie-in work
Priest wrote the tie-in novel to accompany the 1999 David Cronenberg movie eXistenZ, which contains themes of the novels A Dream of Wessex and The Extremes. Such themes include the question of the extent to which we can trust what we believe to be reality and our memories.

Priest was approached to write stories for the 18th and 19th seasons of Doctor Who. The first, "Sealed Orders", was a political thriller based on Gallifrey commissioned by script editor Douglas Adams; it was eventually abandoned due to script problems and replaced with "Warriors' Gate". The second, "The Enemy Within", was also eventually abandoned due to script problems and what Priest perceived as insulting treatment after he was asked to modify the script to include the death of Adric. It was replaced by "Earthshock". Priest received payment while Doctor Who producer John Nathan-Turner and script editor Eric Saward were forced to pen a letter of apology for the treatment of the writer. This falling-out soured the attitude of the production office to the use of established literary authors, and no more were commissioned until Neil Gaiman authored the episode "The Doctor's Wife" in 2011.

A film of his novel The Prestige was released on 20 October 2006. It was directed by Christopher Nolan and starred Christian Bale and Hugh Jackman. Despite differences between the novel and screenplay, Nolan was reportedly so concerned the denouement be kept a surprise that he blocked plans for a lucrative US tie-in edition of the book.

Pseudonyms 
 Priest uses the pseudonyms John Luther Novak and Colin Wedgelock, usually for movie novelizations. As well as the eXistenZ novelization (which undermined the pseudonym by including Priest's biography on the pre-title page), he has novelised the movies Mona Lisa (as John Luther Novak) and Short Circuit (as Colin Wedgelock).
 Priest has co-operated with fellow British science fiction author David Langford on various enterprises under the Ansible brand.

Other writing 
Priest has written for The Guardian since 2002, largely obituaries of such figures as Robert Sheckley, Stanislaw Lem, Jack Williamson, Diana Wynne Jones, John Christopher and many more.

Awards and honours
Priest has won the BSFA award for the best novel four times: in 1974 for Inverted World; in 1998 for The Extremes; in 2002 for The Separation and in 2011 for The Islanders.

He has won the James Tait Black Memorial Prize for Fiction and the World Fantasy Award (for The Prestige).

He won the BSFA award for short fiction in 1979 for the short story "Palely Loitering"; and has been nominated for Hugo Awards in the categories of Best Novel, Best Novella, Best Novelette, and Best Non-Fiction Book (this last for The Book on the Edge of Forever (also known as Last Deadloss Visions), an exploration of the unpublished Last Dangerous Visions anthology). The Space Machine won the International SF prize in the 1977 Ditmar Awards . Priest's 1979 essay "The Making of the Lesbian Horse" (published as a Novacon chapbook) takes a humorous look at the roots of his acclaimed novel Inverted World. He was guest of honour at Novacon 9 in 1979 and Novacon 30 in 2000, and at the 63rd World Science Fiction Convention in 2005.

In 1983 Priest was named one of the 20 Granta Best of Young British Novelists. In 1988 he won the Kurd-Laßwitz-Preis for The Glamour as Best Foreign Fiction Book.

Between 7 November and 7 December 2007, the Chelsea College of Art and Design had an exhibition in its gallery Chelsea Space inspired by Priest's novel The Affirmation. It followed "themes of personal history and memory (which) through the lens of a more antagonistic and critical form of interpretation, aims to point towards an overtly positive viewpoint on contemporary art practice over any traditional melancholy fixation".

Personal life
Priest lived in Devon, but now lives on Isle of Bute. He was married to writer Lisa Tuttle from 1981 to 1987 and to Leigh Kennedy from 1988 to 2011, with whom he had twins. He currently lives with speculative fiction writer Nina Allan.

Bibliography

Novels
Indoctrinaire. London: Faber and Faber, 1970.
Fugue for a Darkening Island. London: Faber and Faber, 1972. Campbell nominee, 1973.
The Inverted World. London: Faber and Faber, 1974. BSFA winner, 1974, Hugo Award nominee, 1975.
The Space Machine. London: Faber and Faber, 1976.
A Dream of Wessex (US title The Perfect Lover). London: Faber and Faber, 1977.
The Affirmation. London: Faber and Faber, 1981. BSFA nominee, 1981.
The Glamour. London: Jonathan Cape, 1984. BSFA nominee, 1984.
Short Circuit. Sphere Books, 1986. (Film tie-in novelisation as Colin Wedgelock)
Mona Lisa. Sphere Books, 1986. (Film tie-in novelisation as John Luther Novak)
The Quiet Woman. London: Bloomsbury, 1990.
The Prestige. London: Simon and Schuster, 1995. BSFA nominee, 1995; World Fantasy Award winner, James Tait Black Memorial Prize winner, Clarke Awards nominee, 1996.
The Extremes. London: Simon and Schuster, 1998. BSFA winner, 1998; Clarke Award nominee, 1999.
eXistenZ. Harper, 1999. (Film tie-in novelisation)
The Separation. Scribner, 2002. Old Earth Books 2005—BSFA winner, 2002; Clark Award winner, Campbell Award nominee, 2003.
The Islanders. Gollancz, 2011. BSFA winner, 2011; Campbell Award winner, 2012.
The Adjacent. Gollancz, 20 June 2013.
The Gradual. Gollancz, 2016.
An American Story. Gollancz, 2018.
The Evidence. Gollancz, 2020.
Expect Me Tomorrow. Gollancz, 2022.

Short story collections
Real-time World. Faber and Faber, 1975. Reissued 2009.
An Infinite Summer. Faber and Faber, 1979. Three stories reissued in The Dream Archipelago.
The Dream Archipelago. Earthlight, 1999. Reissued 2009.
Ersatz Wines – Instructive Short Stories GrimGrin Studio, 2008. Anthology of early works.
Episodes, Gollancz, 2019.

Short story in anthology, also as editor 
 Anticipations. Faber and Faber, 1978.    
 Watson, Ian. Indhold:The Very Slow Time Machine
 Sheckley, Robert. Is That What People Do?
 Shaw, Bob. Amphitheatre
 Priest, Christopher. The Negation
 Harrison, Harry. The Greening Of The Green
 Disch, Thomas M.. Mutability
 Ballard, J.G.. One Afternoon At Utah Beach
 Aldiss, Brian W.. A Chinese Perspective

Screenplay 
The Stooge. 2010 or 2011.

Selected non-fiction 
Your Book of Film-Making. London: Faber and Faber, 1974.
The Making of the Lesbian Horse. Novacon 9 for the Birmingham Science Fiction Group, 1979. Priest attended as the Guest of Honour.
The Book on the Edge of Forever. Seattle: Fantagraphics, 1993.
 "Christopher Priest's Top 10 Slipstream Books". 2003. An essay for London's The Guardian, listing ten seminal novels of the slipstream genre, including works by J. G. Ballard, Angela Carter, Borges, Steve Erickson, and Steven Millhauser.
"Foreword" to Stephen E. Andrews' and Nick Rennison's 100 Must-Read Science Fiction Novels. London: A&C Black Academic and Professional/Bloomsbury Publishing, 2006. . 
The Magic – The Story of a Film. Hastings: GrimGrin Studio, 2008.
"La Jetée". Essay in Cinema Futura: Essays on Favourite Science Fiction Movies, edited by Mark Morris. PS Publishing, 2010. .

References

External links
 
 
 London Calling Interview with Christopher Priest
 
 His story "The Discharge" at Sci Fiction
 1995 interview by David Langford, Ansible (includes brief summaries and comments by Priest on most of his novels to date)
 His Guest of Honour speech at the 2005 World Science Fiction Convention
 Interview de Christopher Priest in Actusf.com, 2000
 

1943 births
Living people
English science fiction writers
English horror writers
World Fantasy Award-winning writers
People from Cheadle, Greater Manchester
James Tait Black Memorial Prize recipients
20th-century English novelists
21st-century British novelists
English male novelists